is a Japanese marketing research company conducting audience measurement for television and radio. Since its foundation in 1962, Video Research has created its own nationwide network of branch offices and founded two international subsidiaries. Video Research USA, Inc. was founded in April 1998 and Video Research International (Thailand) Ltd. in January 2002. Advertising giant Dentsu owns 34% of the company.

Controversies
Video Research sued an unnamed former Nippon Television producer in 2005 for damages. The case ended in an amicable, court-recommended settlement.

References

External links
Official website of Video Research

Market research companies
Dentsu
Audience measurement
Japanese companies established in 1962
Marketing companies established in 1962